Mangifera nicobarica is a species of plant in the family Anacardiaceae. It is endemic to the Nicobar Islands.

References

nicobarica
Flora of the Nicobar Islands
Endangered plants
Taxonomy articles created by Polbot
Taxa named by André Joseph Guillaume Henri Kostermans